Kennington Park Road is a main road in south-east London, England, and is part of the A3 trunk road. It runs from Newington Butts at its Y-junction with Kennington Lane, south-west to the Oval, where the A3 continues as Clapham Road, towards Stockwell. At this crossroads junction, Camberwell New Road and Kennington Oval head towards Camberwell Green and Vauxhall respectively.

Heading south, the street first passes Kennington station and then Kennington Park.

It is part of the Roman Stane Street, from London to Chichester.

Places of interest

The Street has been home to the City and Guilds of London Art School (formerly Lambeth School of Art) since 1879.

External links 
 LondonTown.com information

Streets in the London Borough of Lambeth